Cada día (Each Day) was a Spanish television program broadcast on Antena 3. It was presented by María Teresa Campos, who co-directed it with her daughter Carmen Borrego.

History
After María Teresa Campos had spent eight seasons on Spain's most-watched morning magazine, Telecinco's , in May 2004 the rival network Antena 3 announced it had signed her to host a similar show in the same time slot. Cada día premiered on 9 September 2004, four days ahead of schedule due to the high ratings that Día a día, now presented by Carolina Ferre, was receiving.

Format
The program followed the typical magazine format, combining interviews, news review, gossip, contests, tertulias, fashion, cooking, political debate, etc.

Contributors
Cada días contributors included Bertín Osborne (Defensor del famoso, leaving the program after just one month), Terelu Campos, Coto Matamoros, Rocío Carrasco,  (in a cooking segment), María Eugenia Yagüe, Paloma Gómez Borrero, Cristina Tàrrega, Jimmy Giménez-Arnau, Jesús Mariñas, Miguel Temprano, and Ángel Antonio Herrera.

The political debate panel had members such as María Antonia Iglesias, Curri Valenzuela, Luis Herrero, Javier Nart, Isabel San Sebastián, Enric Sopena, and Carmen Rigalt.

In its second season, which began on 5 September 2005,  joined the show.

Ratings
Viewership did not meet the network's expectations. This led to its definitive cancellation at the end of 2005.

References

External links
 

2004 Spanish television series debuts
2005 Spanish television series endings
Antena 3 (Spanish TV channel) original programming